Medvedovskaya is a rural locality (a stanitsa) in Timashyovsky District of Krasnodar Krai, Russia. Population:

References

Rural localities in Krasnodar Krai